During World War II, Kansas was a major United States Army Air Forces (USAAF) training center for pilots and aircrews of USAAF fighters and bombers. Kansas was favored because it has excellent, year-round flying conditions. The sparsely populated land made ideal locations for gunnery, bombing, and training ranges.

The training that was given to the airmen stationed at these airfields gave them the skills and knowledge that enabled them to enter combat in all theaters of warfare, and enabled the Allies to defeat Nazi Germany and Imperial Japan.

The majority of these airfields were located in rural farmland, near small farming towns.  The effect of stationing thousands of airmen brought the reality of war to rural and small town Kansas. In addition to providing training for servicemen, the air bases provided jobs for many civilians. Civilians were employed in maintenance, repair, and secretarial work.

Major airfields

Postwar use

After the war ended, the vast majority of these airfields were declared surplus by the USAAF and were either sold to the public or turned over to the local community. Most of them today are small, rural general aviation airports. Many World War II-era reminders remain with abandoned runways and streets, with some wartime-era buildings still in use.

Marshall AAF is located at Fort Riley. It is still in use by the United States Army as a military airfield and is not open to the public.

Sherman AAF is located at Fort Leavenworth. Although the airfield is within the confines of a United States Army post and is still used by the military, it has agreement with the city of Leavenworth to permit civilian use at all hours.

Smoky Hill AAF and Topeka AAF became major United States Air Force Strategic Air Command (SAC) bases (Schilling AFB, Forbes AFB). In the 1960s and early 1970s, the active duty Air Force presence was withdrawn and were turned over to the local communities for redevelopment while retaining military cantonment areas for the Air National Guard. Both are still in use by the Kansas Air National Guard, the former for transient military aircraft operations and operation of an adjacent ANG-controlled bombing range, the latter as a tanker base for KC-135 aircraft.

Wichita Army Airfield (now McConnell Air Force Base) is located at the site of Wichita's original municipal airport, which shared a runway with the Boeing Aircraft Wichita facility. Boeing produced B-29 Superfortresses at Wichita and the USAAF Air Materiel Command took over control of the airport in 1942 to accept, service and coordinate the transfer of newly produced aircraft to other installations. It was returned to civilian jurisdiction in 1946 as Wichita Municipal Airport. It was reacquired by the United States Air Force in 1951 and became McConnell AFB.

References

 Maurer, Maurer (1983). Air Force Combat Units Of World War II. Maxwell AFB, Alabama: Office of Air Force History. .
 Shaw, Frederick J. (2004), Locating Air Force Base Sites History's Legacy, Air Force History and Museums Program, United States Air Force, Washington DC, 2004.

External links
 World War II Military Airfields including Auxiliaries and Support fields

 01
World War II
United States World War II army airfields